Napoléon à Austerlitz is a board game published by Jeux Descartes in 1977.

Gameplay
Napoléon à Austerlitz is a Napoleonic wargame.

Reviews
Phoenix #27 (p6)
Jeux & Stratégie #6

References

External links
 

Wargames introduced in 1977